Tomás Navarro Tomás (12 April 1884 – 16 September 1979) was a Spanish philologist, librarian and linguist.

His work in the field of Spanish Philology is one of the key contributions to the Spanish Scientific modernization movement of the twentieth century that took place in the Center of Historical Studies (Centro de Estudios Históricos, CEH by its initials in Spanish).  He is considered one of Professor Ramón Menéndez Pidal's dearest students.

He was also an academic with the Royal Spanish Academy (Real Academia de Española RAE by its initials in Spanish)  and Director of the National Library before he fled to the United States in 1939 where he founded the North American Academy of the Spanish Language (Academia Norte Americana de la Lengua Espanola ANLE by its initials in Spanish)

Life

He received his Doctorate degree in Madrid (1908) as disciple of Ramón Menéndez Pidal and Miguel Asin Palacios.  He then joined the Faculty of Librarians and Curators (Archiveros), and was introduced to the field of Linguistic research as an editor of classic texts such as Las Moradas by Teresa de Jesus (better known in English as "The Interior Castle" or "The Mansions" by the Carmelite nun and mystic Teresa de Avila) and the poetry of Garcilaso de la Vega.  These were first published in the collection “La Lectura”  and then in “Clasicos Castellanos” (Castillian classics) by the publisher Espasa-Calpe. Between 1912 and 1913 he was the recipient of a scholarship by the Assembly for advanced studies (Junta para Ampliacion de Estudios or JAE by its initials in Spanish), to study phonetics and dialectology in French, German and Swiss Universities. Upon his return, he became a collaborator in the Spanish Philology magazine and was appointed as Director of the phonetics laboratory in the CEH associated to the JAE.  He is credited for introducing research methodology to the field of Linguistics in Spain, particularly the Scientific method and its application in teaching the Spanish language.  This is clearly imprinted in his “Manual de Pronunciacion Espanola”  (Spanish pronunciation manual) published in 1918.

As Director of the experimental phonetics laboratory in the CEH he mentored many students.  Two of these students, who later married, were the dialectologists Maria Josefa Canellada and Alonso Zamora Vicente.  It was in this role that he sponsored and supported the research work to generate the Linguistic Atlas of the Iberian Peninsula or ALPI by its initials in Spanish. Aurelio Espinosa (son), Lorenzo Rodriguez-Castellano, Manuel Sanchis Guarner, Francesc de Borja Mo, Anibal Otero were some of the researchers that comprised the team in addition to their Portuguese colleagues Rodrigo de Sá Nogueira, Armando Nobre de Gusmão y Luís Lindley Cintra.

Works
 Manual de Pronunciacion Espanola, 1918
Estudios de Fonologia Espanola, 1946
Manual de Entonacion Espanola, 1948
El Espanol de Puerto Rico, 1948
Metrica Espanola, 1956 (y Metrica espanola resena historica y descriptiva, 1966)
Documentos Linguisticos del Alto Aragon, 1957
Arte del Verso, 1959
Atlas Linguistico de la Peninsula Iberica, 1962
La voz y la entonacion de los personajes literarios, 1976

References

 JIMENEZ-LANDI, Antonio (1987). La Institucion Libre de Ensenanza (4 volumenes) (Edicion en Linea de la Universidad de Barcelona). Editorial Taurus 
 Homenaje a don Tomas Navarro Tomas. Boletin de la Academia Norteamericana de la Lengua Espanola. 4-5: 105–117. 1980. Consulado el 24 de agosto de 2017.
 Azcuenaga Cavia, Carmen (2010). Ernesto Caballero Garrido (coordinador), ed.  La Junta para la Ampliacion de Estudios e Investigaciones Cientificas: historias de sus centros y protagonistas(1907-1939). Trea y Asociacion Nacional de Estudiantes e Investigadores SIGLO XXI 
 Sanchez (Coordinador), Isidro (2012). ALMUD, ed. Educacion, Ciencia y Cultura en Espana: Auge y colapso (1907-1940). Pensionados de la JAE. Ciudad Real: Ediciones Castilla-La Mancha 

1884 births
1979 deaths
Linguists from Spain
Spanish emigrants to the United States
20th-century linguists